Deben Rural District was a rural district in the county of East Suffolk, England. It was created in 1934 by the merger of parts of the disbanded Bosmere and Claydon Rural District, the disbanded Plomesgate Rural District and the disbanded Woodbridge Rural District, under a County Review Order. It was named after the River Deben and administered from Woodbridge.

Its area was reduced slightly in 1952 by an expansion of the county borough of Ipswich.

On 1 April 1974, it was abolished under the Local Government Act 1972, and has since formed part of the District of Suffolk Coastal.

Statistics

Parishes
At the time of its dissolution it consisted of the following 66 civil parishes.

References

History of Suffolk
Districts of England abolished by the Local Government Act 1972
1934 establishments in England